The Smith-Burges Baronetcy, of East Ham in the County of Essex, was a title in the Baronetage of Great Britain. It was created on 4 May 1793 for John Smith Burges, a Director of the Honourable East India Company. Born John Smith, he had assumed by Royal licence the additional surname of Burges in 1790, which was that of his father-in-law, Ynyr Burges, Secretary of the Honourable East India Company. Smith-Burges was childless and the title became extinct on his death in 1803.

Smith-Burges baronets, of East Ham (1793)
Sir John Smith-Burges, 1st Baronet (–1803)

References

Extinct baronetcies in the Baronetage of Great Britain
1793 establishments in England